Nangli Wazidpur is a village in the western part of the state of Uttar Pradesh. It forms part of the New Okhla Industrial Development Authority's planned industrial city, Noida, falling in Sector-135, noida. Nangli Wazidpur is about 25 kilometers (12 mi) southeast of New Delhi and Nangli Wazidpur is around 900 meters from Yamuna Expressway, formerly known as Taj Expressway, and opposite Sector 93. The village is a part of the Dadri Vidhan Sabha (state assembly) constituency and Gautam Buddh Nagar Lok Sabha (parliamentary) constituency. In terms of caste structure, Rajputs (Hindus) are the majority in this village. The village was founded by "Chaudhary Kishanshah Chauhan " a Great social reformer from Honi family.

Climate

Nangli Wazidpur falls under the catchment area of the Yamuna river and is located on the old river bed. The soil is rich and loamy. Nangli Wazidpur has a hot and humid climate for most of the year. It becomes very hot during June, which is followed by the monsoon period somewhere between mid-June and mid-September. In summer (March to June) the weather remains hot and the temperature ranges from a maximum of 48 °C to a minimum of 28 °C. Noida,  Monsoon is quite unpredictable and you can't predict which way they will turn. Monsoon has never been like the one we witness in other parts of India, say for example Mumbai. Winter in Nangli Wazidpur is very chilly which peaks in at the start of November and continues till the month of February. The foggy and chilly weather during winters makes the village climate a tough one to confront with.

The cold waves from the Himalayan region make the winters in the village chilly. Temperatures fall down to as low as 10 to 4 °C at the peak of winters. In January a dense fog envelopes the village, reducing visibility on the streets.

Beri wale Baba Temple
The beri wale Baba temple is situated in the village Nagli wazidpur. The great yogi Beri wale Baba is said to meditate under Ber tree in 18th century. The Ber tree is still there along with the temple where large numbers of devotees attend darshans of Devi devtas. Every year on Holi and Diwali  thousands of devotees came to have darshan at temple.

Issues

Farmer's oppression's
Nangli Wazidpur farmers have been demanding a hike in compensation for their land acquired by the Noida Authority from past many decades. Buoyed by the courts' quashing several farmland acquisitions in Noida Extension, village farmers whose land was acquired eight years ago for development are demanding a share in the upcoming infrastructure. They say they have a right to get free checkups at hospitals and education for their children. Village lands were acquired in 2003 and a less compensation of Rs 329 per M2 was given to farmers.

Illegal sand mining
Illegal sand mining is adding to the plight of the Yamuna river in the banks of whole Yamuna area. It has not only changed the course of the river but also made its riverbed unstable, thus disturbing the biodiversity of the region.

References 

Villages in Gautam Buddh Nagar district
Neighbourhoods in Noida